Raegan Rutty (born January 14, 2002) is a Caymanian artistic gymnast. She has represented the Cayman Islands at the 2020 Olympic Games, the 2018 Commonwealth Games, the 2019 Pan American Games, and the 2018 and 2019 World Championships.  She was the Cayman Islands' first ever Olympic gymnast.

Early life 
Rutty was born in the Cayman Islands in 2002 and is an eighth-generation Caymanian.  She began gymnastics when she was four years old because her older sister was also in the sport.  At 15 Rutty left the Cayman Islands to train in Houston, Texas and lived with a host family prior to attending the University of Florida.

Gymnastics career

Junior

2016–17
Rutty made her international debut at the 2016 Pan American Championships.  She finished 26th in the all-around.  She next competed at the Junior Commonwealth Games where she finished 16th in the all-around.

In 2017 Rutty competed at the Central American Sports Festival where she placed 16th.

Senior

2018
Rutty turned senior in 2018.  She made her senior debut at the 2018 Commonwealth Games.  During qualifications she placed 30th in the all-around and did not qualify for the final. Rutty next competed at the Central American and Caribbean Games.  She only competed on the uneven bars due to sustaining an injury during warm-ups.  She next competed at the Pan American Championships where she finished 40th in the all-around.

Rutty was selected to represent the Cayman Islands at the 2018 World Championships in Doha.  During qualifications she finished 137th in the all-around; she did not qualify for any event finals, but was the highest ranking for a Caymanian gymnast.

2019
Rutty competed at the 2019 Pan American Games where she finished 38th during qualifications.  Rutty was selected to represent the Cayman Islands at the 2019 World Championships in Stuttgart.  During qualifications she finished 158th in the all-around and did not qualify for the finals, nor did she qualify as an individual to the 2020 Olympic Games.  However, Rutty was eligible to earn an Olympic berth via the tripartite invitation, which is selected closer to start of the Olympic Games.

2021
Rutty competed at the Pan American Championships in June.  While there she finished 35th in the all-around.  On June 28 Rutty officially received the Tripartite Invitation, an Olympic berth allocated to countries with less than eight athletes in individual sports or disciplines at the last two editions of the Olympic Games, to compete at the 2020 Summer Olympics.  She became the first Caymanian Olympic gymnast and was the third Caymanian athlete qualified to the Tokyo Olympics after sprinter Kemar Hyman and swimmer Brett Fraser.  Rutty was later joined by athlete Shalysa Wray and swimmer Jillian Crooks who also received tripartite invitations in their respective sports.  At the Olympic Games Rutty finished 80th in qualification and did not advance to any event finals.

Competitive history

References

External links
 

2002 births
Living people
Caymanian female artistic gymnasts
Gymnasts at the 2019 Pan American Games
Gymnasts at the 2018 Commonwealth Games
Pan American Games competitors for the Cayman Islands
Commonwealth Games competitors for the Cayman Islands
Gymnasts at the 2020 Summer Olympics
Olympic gymnasts of the Cayman Islands